John Joseph Lynch (21 December 1905 – 12 October 1979) was an Australian rules footballer who played with North Melbourne in the Victorian Football League (VFL).

He later briefly served in the Australian Army in World War II before being medically discharged.

Notes

External links 

1905 births
1979 deaths
Australian rules footballers from Victoria (Australia)
North Melbourne Football Club players